Trident is an album by the rock band Kingfish.  Their second studio album and their third album overall, it was recorded at the Record Plant in Sausalito, California, and released by Jet Records in 1978.

Trident features Kingfish co-founders Matthew Kelly on guitar and Dave Torbert on bass.  Original members Robbie Hoddinott and Chris Herold had left the band before the album was recorded, and had been replaced by lead guitarist Michael O'Neill and ex-Wings drummer Joe English, respectively.  Rounding out the lineup was keyboardist Bob Hogins.

Track listing

"Hard to Love Somebody" (Michael O'Neill)
"Cheyenne" (John Carter, Tim Gilbert)
"Hurricane" (O'Neill, Matthew Kelly)
"My Friend" (Bob Hogins)
"Magic Eyes" (Dave Torbert)
"Movin' Down the Highway" (O'Neill)
"Hawaii" (Torbert, Kelly)
"You and I" (Hogins)
"Feels So Good" (Hogins, O'Neill, Torbert)
"Take It Too Hard" (O'Neill)

Personnel

Kingfish
Matthew Kelly – guitar, harmonica, vocals
Dave Torbert – bass, vocals
Michael O'Neill – guitar, vocals
Bob Hogins – keyboards, vocals
Joe English – drums

Additional musicians
John Hug – guitar
Johnny Sandlin – bass
Dave Perper – vocals

Production
Johnny Sandlin – producer
Carolyn Harris – production assistant
Tom Anderson, Tom Flye – engineers
Alex Kash, Steve Fontano – assistant engineers
Kurt Kinzel, Johnny Sandlin, Carolyn Harris – additional recording and mixing
James A. Nelson – trident logo design
Michael Zigaris – photography

Notes

Kingfish (band) albums
1978 albums